Calamaria ingeri is a species of snake of the family Colubridae.

Geographic range
The snake is endemic to Tioman Island in Malaysia.

Etymology
This species is named in honor of Robert Frederick Inger.

References 

ingeri
Endemic fauna of Malaysia
Reptiles of Malaysia
Reptiles described in 2004